Tantalus Provincial Park is a provincial park located in the Tantalus Range overlooking Squamish Valley in British Columbia, Canada. It was established on December 19, 1998 to protect a large area of pristine alpine wilderness.

History
The mountains where the park now resides have been the home of the Squamish First Nation since time immemorial.

In 1988, the Lake Lovely Water Recreation Area was established for the purpose of protecting the alpine lake area and for providing mountaineering opportunities in the Tantalus Range. The recreation area was greatly expanded and upgraded to a Class A Park on December 19, 1998.

Geography
The provincial park is located west of the Squamish River and is entirely within Squamish-Lillooet Regional District. It borders Esté-tiwilh Sigurd Creek Conservancy to the northeast and Brackendale Eagles Provincial Park to the southeast. The park protects the northeastern slope of the Tantalus Range, including the entirety of Alpha Mountain and Omega Mountain. Other notable features include Lake Lovely Water, Zenith Lake, Sigurd Lake, and Madden Falls.

Activities
Popular park activities include hiking, rock climbing, backcountry camping, and fishing. The park features a small day-use area with pit toilets in the Lake Lovely Water area.

See also
List of British Columbia Provincial Parks

References

External links

Provincial parks of British Columbia
Sea-to-Sky Corridor